Smashwords, Inc., based in Los Gatos, California, is a platform for  self-publishing e-books. The company, founded by  Mark Coker, began public operation in 2008.

Authors and independent publishers upload their manuscripts as electronic files to the  service, which converts them into multiple e-book formats for  various devices. Once published, the books are made available for sale online at a price set by the author or independent publisher.

History
Coker began work on Smashwords in 2005 and officially launched the website in May 2008. Within the first seven months of launching, the website published 140 books. Due to initially low profits, the firm switched to a distribution model that offered retailers a "30% commission in exchange for digital shelf space". Smashwords achieved a profit in 2010 and has distributed some of its books via  Apple, Barnes & Noble, Kobo,   Sony,  and KDP, Amazon.com's e-book publishing website.

In 2012, Smashwords announced that it would partner with 3M Cloud Library, which would allow for the option for their authors' books to be available in libraries, and that it had reached about 127,000 titles by 44,000 authors.

Coker, a former Silicon Valley publicist, started Smashwords in 2008 with the claimed goal of using technology to democratize publishing—allowing writers to appeal directly to readers without having to deal with gatekeepers such as agents and editors. In keeping with this mission, Smashwords applies no editorial screening. The only e-books the firm rejects are ones that contain plagiarism, illegal content or incitement to racism, homophobia or violence.

Smashwords does not use digital rights management.

References

External links 

Ebook suppliers
Self-publishing companies
Companies based in Silicon Valley
Companies based in Santa Clara County, California
Los Gatos, California
2008 establishments in California
American companies established in 2008
Internet properties established in 2008